= Barocho railway station =

Railway station in Sindh, Pakistan

Barocho railway station ٻاروچو باغ ريلوي اسٽيشن

General information
- Owner: Ministry of Railways

Other information
- Station code: BRBG

History
- Former names: Great Indian Peninsula Railway

Barocho railway station (Urdu: باروچھو ریلوے اسٹیشن, Sindhi: ٻاروچو باغ ريلوي اسٽيشن) is located in Sindh, Pakistan. The station is known to be closed as of 2004.

== See also ==
- List of railway stations in Pakistan
- Pakistan Railways
